The Dr. Generous Henderson House is a historic home located at 1016 The Paseo, once one of the most prestigious areas of Kansas City, Missouri.

History
It was designed by local architect, Rudolf Markgraf and built in 1899. It is a three-story, Second Renaissance Revival style brick and stone dwelling with terra cotta ornamentation. It has two-story rear section and measures approximately 55 feet long and 42 feet wide.  It features a cast iron cornice, oriel window, and columns. Also on the property is a contributing carriage house. The house was built for a Dr. Generous Henderson (1844–1924). His medical practice in Kansas City went on for forty-five years. The house is one of the few surviving examples of the Second Renaissance Revival style of architecture in Kansas City.

It was listed on the National Register of Historic Places in 1979.

References

Houses on the National Register of Historic Places in Missouri
Renaissance Revival architecture in Missouri
Houses completed in 1899
Houses in Kansas City, Missouri
National Register of Historic Places in Kansas City, Missouri